Viviana Mazza (born 15 June 1978, Catania, Sicily) is a writer and a journalist at the foreign desk for the Italian daily newspaper Corriere della Sera. At Corriere she specializes in covering the United States and the Middle East. She has also covered, among other countries, Pakistan, Afghanistan and Nigeria. 
She edits the America-Cina newsletter and contributes to the La27Ora blog.

In November 2015 (together with Paolo Valentino) she was the first European newspaper journalist to interview the Iranian president, Hassan Rouhani, after his election.

On November 1st, 2022 Mazza became only the second woman to be the US correspondent for Corriere della Sera, currently in New York.

She has published the following books for Mondadori: Storia di Malala (July 2013), Il Bambino Nelson Mandela (November 2014) and a version of the Storia di Malala book for younger children (September 2015).
In April 2016 she published Ragazze rubate, written with Adaobi Tricia Nwaubani. It tells the story of the young girls kidnapped in Nigeria by Boko Haram. 
In July 2016 a version for younger readers of Il Bambino Nelson Mandela was published.
In October 2018 she published Guerrieri di sogni. Storie e paesi che dovresti conoscere.
In May 2019 she published Greta. La ragazza che sta cambiando il mondo.
In June 2020 she published La ragazza che imparò a volare. Storia di Simone Biles.
In May 2021 Mondadori published Il bambino fiocco di neve in a special easy-to-read edition for children and people with reading difficulties.
In September 2021 Mondadori published Il potere della musica , a story taken from Guerrieri di sogni. Storie e paesi che dovresti conoscere with new, original illustrations by Paolo d'Altan.
In October 2021 Mondadori published Io dico no al razzismo written together with Kibra Sebhat.

In collaboration with Minna Proctor she translated Tullio Kezich's book Federico Fellini His Life and Work into English.

She contributed a chapter to Che cos'è l'ISIS, a collaborative effort by Corriere della Sera journalists.

In March 2019 Solferino Libri published Le ragazze di via Rivoluzione.

22 June 2019. She was made an honorary citizen of Solarino, a town in the province of Syracuse, Sicily: the birthplace of her mother and grandmother.

Biography
Mazza studied at the liceo classico Mario Cutelli in Catania. She then moved to Turin where she obtained her bachelor's degree at Turin University (2001). After Turin she won a Fulbright Scholarship and completed a Master of Science in Journalism at Columbia University, New York (2004). She was also awarded a Graduate Diploma in Refugee Studies at the American University in Cairo, Egypt (2005).

She has worked for or collaborated with several newspapers and magazines: La Stampa, Giornale di Sicilia,
 Colors
, Egypt Today.

Bibliography
Kezich, Tullio. Federico Fellini : his life and work. New York: Faber and Faber, 2006. .
Mazza, Viviana, and Paolo d'Altan. Storia di Malala. Milano: Mondadori, 2013. .
Mazza, Viviana, and Paolo d'Altan. Il bambino Nelson Mandela. Milano: Mondadori, 2014. .
Mazza, Viviana, and Paolo d'Altan. La storia di Malala : raccontata ai bambini. Milano: Mondadori, 2015. .
Mazza, Viviana, Adaobi Nwaubani, and Paolo d'Altan. Ragazze rubate. Milano: Mondadori, 2016. 
Mazza, Viviana, and Paolo d'Altan. Guerrieri di sogni. Storie e paesi che dovresti conoscere. Milano: Mondadori, 2018. 
Mazza, Viviana. Le ragazze di via Rivoluzione. Solferino, 2019. 
Mazza, Viviana. Greta. La ragazza che sta cambiando il mondo. Mondadori, 2019. 
Mazza, Viviana. La ragazza che imparò a volare. Storia di Simone Biles. Mondadori, 2020. 
Mazza, Viviana. Il bambino fiocco di neve. Mondadori, 2021. 
Mazza, Viviana, and Paolo d'Altan. Il potere della musica. Mondadori, 2021. 
Mazza, Viviana, and Kibra Sebhat. Io dico no al razzismo. Mondadori, 2021.

Awards
 Marco Luchetta Prize for Journalism 2010
 Amerigo Award 2010
 Nino Martoglio International Literary Prize 2014
 Giovanni Arpino Prize 2014
 Mediterranean Award - Jury Prize 2015
 Festival Giornalisti del Mediterraneo - Medaglia di Bronzo del Presidente della Camera dei Deputati 2016
 Premio Letterario Delle Quattro Libertà 2019 - "Libertà di opinione", for her book Le Ragazze di via Rivoluzione
 Premio Biaggio Agnes per Reportage 2020
 Premio Estra per lo Sport 2020

References

External links
 La27ora http://27esimaora.corriere.it/
 Viviana Mazza on Twitter https://twitter.com/viviana_mazza
 Storia di Malala on Facebook "Storia di Malala"
 Video and Reportage by Mazza "Isis: Tortura psicologica sui bambini" Corriere della Sera, November 2015
 Viviana Mazza "Nazioni Unite in Siria" Corriere della Sera, May 2012
 Video and Reportage by Mazza "Guerra dei tunnel in Damasco" Corriere della Sera, 2014
 Video and Reportage by Mazza "Homs: è morta la rivoluzione" Corriere della Sera, 2014

Italian journalists
1978 births
Living people